Peter Polycarpou is an English-Cypriot actor, best known for playing Chris Theodopolopodous in the television comedy series Birds of a Feather and Louis Charalambos in The Lost Honour of Christopher Jefferies.

Early life 
Polycarpou was born in Brighton as son of a family of Greek Cypriots. Together with his sister Eve Polycarpou he spent his first years in the St Angela's children's home in Brighton. When he was six years old, he and his sister could return to live with their family.

Career 
Polycarpou's work in movies includes Evita (alongside Madonna), Oklahoma!, and De-Lovely. On stage, he was the first actor to play the role of John in the musical Miss Saigon in London. He was an original cast member of the musical Les Misérables, being an understudy for the role of Enjolras.  He has also played The Phantom in Andrew Lloyd Webber's The Phantom of the Opera. He has also appeared in the UK première of The Woods by David Mamet at the Finborough Theatre, London.  Television work has included The Bill, Holby City, Casualty and Waking the Dead. In 1992, he sang the theme tune to Love Hurts charting in the UK at number 26.

In February 2006, Polycarpou appeared in EastEnders, playing Yannis Pappas, father-in-law of character Carly Wicks for 3 episodes. More recently, he played a leading role in the movie O Jerusalem, released in 2007. He also starred in a short film Broken alongside Michelle Collins playing the leading role of Solomon. The film about a Greek Cypriot immigrant family in 1960s London won several international awards. He wrote and co-directed his own short film Mad George with ex-musician and long time friend John Hoare. The film has shown at several International Film Festivals.

Recent work includes playing Gash in Bryony Lavery's play Last Easter, directed by Douglas Hodge, at the Door Theatre in Birmingham, and the leading role of Daniel Warshowsky in the musical Imagine This at the New London Theatre in 2008.

In 2010, he starred alongside Sean Bean and Charlotte Rampling in the terrorist thriller Cleanskin, which was released in 2012. He also appeared in the eighth series of Hustle for BBCTV directed by actor Adrian Lester.

Between 2010 and 2011, he appeared alongside Emma Williams and Michael Xavier in the Chichester Festival Theatre's Love Story. It later transferred to the Duchess Theatre where it had a short run.

He also worked at Chichester Festival Theatre between 24 September and 5 November 2011 – playing Beadle Bamford in Sweeney Todd (alongside Love Story producer Michael Ball as Sweeney Todd). He returned to Chichester in 2014 to star alongside Sophie Thompson in Guys and Dolls. Later that year he played the Hollywood mogul Buddy Fiddler in Larry Gelbart City of Angels at the Donmar Theatre, London.

In 2015 he appeared in 9 episodes of the FOX TV drama Tyrant playing Colonel Mahmoud.

In September 2017 he played Ahmed Qurie in J.T. Rogers stage play Oslo at London's National Theatre, accompanying the production when it transferred to the West End in the following month. He was nominated for an Olivier Award in the Best Supporting Actor category for his portrayal of Ahmed Qurie. In July 2018 he narrated Raja Shehadeh's biographical Where the Line is Drawn: Crossing Boundaries in Occupied Palestine for BBC Radio 4's Book of the Week.

In 2019 he played Sancho in Man of La Mancha for English National Opera at the London Coliseum opposite Kelsey Grammer as Cervantes/Quixote, Danielle de Niese as Aldonza/Dulcinea and Nicholas Lyndhurst as the Governor/Innkeeper.

As a playwright Peter Polycarpou has staged his plays about UK Cypriots searching for their roots and identity ' Searching For The Lemons and 'Cypriot Graffiti'  at Theatro Technis.

Philanthropy and culture 
Polycarpou was once a member of the Green Party and stood for local election in the Muswell Hill ward. He is patron of the United Kingdom Thalassaemia Society and has run in the London Marathon three times.

Polycarpou is also a drama teacher and has developed a one-day workshop which he teaches in youth theatres and schools throughout the UK. He has directed a production of the Les Misérables Schools edition for the Act Too Youth theatre in Sussex, UK and the musical Rent.

Polycarpou is the patron of First Stages firststages.org.uk , a musical theatre youth group based in Devizes, Wiltshire. He takes an active part in the group and regularly coaches and directs whenever he can.

Polycarpou took an active interest in the Cypriot Film Festival UK. He has been a Director of The Royal Theatrical Fund since 2011.

He has played cricket for the Lord's Taverners as a wicketkeeper.

References

External links 
 
 
 Peter Polycarpou at United Kingdom Thalassaemia Society

1957 births
Living people
Alumni of Middlesex University
British male stage actors
British male television actors
British people of Greek Cypriot descent